Herbert Philip "Bert" Williams (July 24, 1908 – January 10, 1990) was an American sailor and Olympic champion. He competed at the 1956 Summer Olympics in Melbourne, where he received a gold medal in the star class with the boat Kathleen, together with Lawrence Low.

References

External links
 
 
 

1908 births
1990 deaths
American male sailors (sport)
Chicago Yacht Club
Olympic gold medalists for the United States in sailing
Sailors at the 1956 Summer Olympics – Star
Medalists at the 1956 Summer Olympics